Tarvagatai River is a river in the Teshig sum of Bulgan aimag in Mongolia. It starts about 30 km north of the sum center of Selenge sum in the Angarkhai mountain range, and discharges into the Egiin Gol ca 55 km west of that.

References

See also
List of rivers of Mongolia

Rivers of Mongolia